KJBB-LP (94.7 FM; Bear Radio) is a terrestrial American low power radio station, licensed to Brownsboro, Henderson County, Texas, United States, and is owned by the Brownsboro Independent School District.

References

External links

JBB-LP
JBB-LP
Radio stations established in 2015
2015 establishments in Texas
Community radio stations in the United States